The Findlay Oilers Men's Ice Hockey is a defunct NCAA's Division I ice hockey team. The Oilers joined the Division I ranks in 1999 as a founding member of the College Hockey America (CHA) conference, along with six other schools, after only three years in existence as a Division II program. Findlay spent five years in the CHA, never finishing higher than fourth in the standings, and only winning a single game in the conference tournament.

After a change to the administration of Findlay in the summer of 2003, the University announced on January 6, 2004 that the ice hockey program would revert to club and intramural status. The change did not come as a shock to many familiar with Findlay's situation as head coach Craig Barnett had already resigned to take a position with Lake Forest Academy prep school. The MAAC refused to allow any of its teams to play the Oilers for the 2000-01 season because of conference by-laws prohibiting member teams from playing provisional Division I schools. When the CHA applied for its automatic tournament bid in 2002, the NCAA had reservations about Findlay's full Division I status as it had moved the University's athletic program to Division II status only four years earlier. Because NCAA rules mandate that automatic bid conferences must contain at least six member schools the CHA scrambled to resolve the waiver that would allow Findlay to play in the conference despite the 9-year moratorium mandated by the NCAA on teams playing above their level. The CHA was able to receive the bid for the 2003 season after a waiver was granted retroactively.

Season-by-season records

All-time coaching records

Division I

Division II

References

 
College men's ice hockey teams in the United States